Roger Flanders (February 3, 1901 – July 8, 1965) was an American wrestler. He competed in the freestyle heavyweight event at the 1924 Summer Olympics.

References

1901 births
1965 deaths
Olympic wrestlers of the United States
Wrestlers at the 1924 Summer Olympics
American male sport wrestlers
People from Lancaster, New Hampshire
Sportspeople from New Hampshire